Aérocentre is a French cluster of aerospace engineering companies and research centres created in 2009. It is in the region of Centre-Val de Loire in the middle of France.

Overview
There are over 321 companies. About 20,000 people work there in the aviation and space flight industries.

The headquarters of Aérocentre is located at the Châteauroux-Centre "Marcel Dassault" Airport. The chairman of the cluster is Jean-Michel SANCHEZ.

Partners 
 Agence régionale pour l'innovation
 Groupe Banque Populaire
 Airemploi
 Centre d'études supérieures industrielles of Orléans
 Électricité de France
 Institut Polytechnique des Sciences Avancées

Sources and references

External links 
 Website of Aérocentre 

Aviation in France
Aerospace engineering organizations
Economy of France
High-technology business districts in France
Buildings and structures in Centre-Val de Loire